Milton Makongoro Mahanga (born 3 April 1955)  is a Tanzanian CCM politician and Member of Parliament for Segerea constituency since 2010. He is the current Deputy Minister of Labour and Employment.

References

1955 births
Living people
Chama Cha Mapinduzi MPs
Tanzanian MPs 2000–2005
Tanzanian MPs 2005–2010
Tanzanian MPs 2010–2015
Deputy government ministers of Tanzania
Tanzanian accountants
Mara Secondary School alumni
Tambaza Secondary School alumni
Institute of Finance Management alumni
Alumni of the University of Strathclyde